"Carolina in the Pines" is a song written and recorded by American country music artist Michael Martin Murphey. It was released in August 1975 as the second and final single from the album Blue Sky - Night Thunder. It peaked at number 21 on the U.S. Billboard Hot 100 chart, number 4 on the Adult Contemporary chart, and number 25 on the Canadian RPM Top Singles chart in late 1975. The song was re-recorded with John McEuen on banjo and released in May 1985 from his compilation album The Best of Michael Martin Murphey. The re-release peaked at number 9 on the U.S. Billboard Hot Country Singles chart and at number 11 on the Canadian RPM Country Tracks chart in mid-1985.  Bluegrass band The Special Consensus recorded the song on their 2002 album, Route 10.

Background
"Carolina in the Pines" addresses Martin's wife whose actual name was Caroline: "I tried to write a love song about my wife without trying to relegate her to a secondary position as a supporter of me. I tried to make it about her as an individual. That's what [she and I] try to do in life." Caroline Hogue was the second of Murphey's five wives: the couple had married in 1973 and would divorce in 1978.

Critical reception
Billboard magazine reviewed the song favorably, calling it "a countryish tune in a distinct John Denver vein."

Personnel
 Michael Murphey – vocals
 Jac Murphy – piano
 John McEuen - banjo

Chart performance

Original release

Re-release

References

1975 songs
1975 singles
1985 singles
Michael Martin Murphey songs
Songs written by Michael Martin Murphey
Song recordings produced by Bob Johnston
Warner Records singles